Dumri is a village in the Buxar district of Bihar state in India. It is located 25 km east of the District headquarters Buxar. It is situated at a distance of 8 km from Simri and 111 km from the state capital Patna. It has total 1207 families residing. Dumri has population of 8794 as per government records.

Dumri is surrounded by Dumraon Block towards the south, Brahmpur Block towards the east, Dubhar Block towards the north, and Ballia Block towards the north. This place is on the border of the Buxar District and Ballia District. Ballia District Ballia is north towards this place. It is near to the Uttar Pradesh State Border.
D. K. M. College Dumri and KP High School Dumri are located there.

Administration
Dumri village is administrated by Mukhiya through its Gram Panchayat, who is elected representative of village as per constitution of India and Panchyati Raj Act.

References

See also
Buxar
Bihar

Villages in Buxar district